James A. Jewell (c.1840 – February 3, 1912) was a Member of the Board of General Appraisers.

Education and career

Jewell was born in Verona, New York, c. 1840. He served as a Lieutenant Colonel of the New York Volunteers for the United States Army from 1862 to 1865. He served as Chief of Special Agents in the United States Department of the Treasury in New York City and Boston, Massachusetts from 1885 to 1889 and served as a Special Agent from 1889 to 1890.

Federal Judicial Service

Jewell was nominated by President Benjamin Harrison on July 2, 1890, to the Board of General Appraisers, to a new seat created by 26 Stat. 131. He was confirmed by the United States Senate on July 16, 1890, and received his commission on July 17, 1890. His service terminated circa July 15, 1903, to August 12, 1903, due to his resignation. He was succeeded by Charles P. McClelland.

Death

Jewell died on February 3, 1912, in New York City and is buried at Woodlawn Cemetery in The Bronx, New York.

References

Sources
 

1912 deaths
Date of birth unknown
Members of the Board of General Appraisers
United States Article I federal judges appointed by Benjamin Harrison
19th-century American judges